Mega Zone may refer to:

Mega Zone (video game)
MegaZone, a video game magazine
Megazone 23, an anime
Megazone or Darkzone, a laser tag site